Lake Copais, also spelled Kopais or Kopaida, was a lake in the centre of Boeotia, Greece, west of Thebes. It was drained in the late 19th century. It is now flat dry land and is still known as Kopaida. A one-time island in the lake was modified in ancient times into a megalithic citadel, now called Gla, though its ancient name is not known. It may be the city of Arne mentioned by Homer.

Drainage

When the lake existed, the towns of Haliartus, Orchomenus, and Chaeronea were on its shores. Rivers feeding the lake included the Cephissus, Termessus and Triton. The lake was (and is) surrounded by fertile land, but the lake increasingly encroached on the surrounding land because of inadequate drainage. In response to this, in 1867–1887 Scots and French engineers reclaimed the land for the British Lake Copais Company, by building channels to drain water from the lake to the Cephissus and from there to Lake Yliki (Ylíki Limní, ancient Hylica). This land was returned to the Greek government in 1952.

The Kopais Lake Agency was created in 1957 to supervise the draining of the lake and building of a new road. The task was completed that same year, but the agency with full-time staff of 30 (including a driver for the president of the agency) still existed until 2010.

Before this the lake drained into the sea by numerous subterranean channels. Some of these channels were artificial, as the 1st century geographer Strabo recorded. Modern excavation has found enormous channels dug in the 14th century BC which drained water into the sea to the northeast; Strabo mentions work being done on these channels by an engineer named Crates of Chalcis in the time of Alexander the Great.

Lake Copais in ancient literature and mythology

The Copais lake was probably drained first during the bronze age by the Mycenaeans, creating one of the most sophisticated agricultural water management systems in the ancient Aegean. Excavated remains  indicate that up to 400,000,000 m³ of stone and roughly 200,000,000 m³ of earth were moved in order to regulate the Kephissos and Melas river by a complex system of polder dykes, which drained the basin during the flood seasons. The system featured a central, 25 km long, stone lined canal, up to 40 m wide and 2.5 m deep. Multiple smaller canals and a series of natural subterranean holes or 'katavothres' were used to d

There was a legend that the lake came into being when the hero Heracles flooded the area by digging out a river, the Cephissus, which poured into the basin. Polyaenus explains that he did this because he was fighting the Minyans of Orchomenus: they were dangerous horseback fighters, and Heracles dug the lake in order to unhorse them. Another story has the lake overflow in the mythical time of Ogyges, resulting in the Ogygian deluge.

The travel writer Pausanias and the 5th century BC comic playwright Aristophanes record that in antiquity Lake Copais was known for its fish, especially the eels.

References

External links

 see especially 9.2.16-27 (translated by H.L. Jones, 1924)
 (translated W.H.S. Jones and H.A. Ormerod, 1918)
Google Earth air view of the Lake Copais plain
Google Earth ground view across the Lake Copais plain from the south
Google Earth ground view across the Lake Copais plain from the east
Google Earth ground view in the middle of the Lake Copais plain
Wikimedia Commons

Landforms of Boeotia
Ancient Greek geography
Copais
Plains of Greece